Chevandré Conwin van Schoor (born  in Paarl, South Africa) is a South African rugby union player, who most recently played first class rugby with . He can play as a centre or a winger.

Career

Youth

At high school level, Van Schoor was selected in the  side that played at the 2010 Under-18 Craven Week tournament in Welkom. Van Schoor played in two matches and scored a try against KwaZulu-Natal. He also started two matches for the  side during the 2010 Under-19 Provincial Championship.

He played some rugby for Harmony Sports Academy and then made appearances in all eight of the  side's fixtures in Division B of the 2011 Under-19 Provincial Championship, helping his side win the title by beating  in the final.

He returned to the Western Cape in 2012 where he played some club rugby in the Western Province Super League A before he represented  at the 2012 7s Premier League in George. He was named in the 2013 Vodacom Cup squad, but failed to make an appearance. He also played one match for the  side that won the 2013 Under-21 Provincial Championship.

Western Province

He was once again included in 's Vodacom Cup side for the 2014 tournament. His first senior start came a fortnight later in their match against  in George.

He was named in 's Currie Cup squad for the first time prior to the 2014 Currie Cup Premier Division. However, he joined near-neighbours  on loan for their 2014 Currie Cup First Division campaign (see below).

Boland Cavaliers

References

South African rugby union players
Living people
1992 births
Sportspeople from Paarl
Rugby union centres
Rugby union wings
Boland Cavaliers players
Western Province (rugby union) players
Eastern Province Elephants players
Rugby union players from the Western Cape